American Studies (AMSJ) is a quarterly peer-reviewed academic journal covering issues broadly concerning American culture, society, as well as international perspectives. The journal is sponsored by the Mid-America American Studies Association, the University of Kansas, and the University of Minnesota. The American Studies editorial board is made up of 46 members from 38 institutions in 7 countries.

History 
American Studies became a major journal in 1959, when it was first known as the Journal of the Central Mississippi Valley American Studies Association and later as the Midcontinent American Studies Journal. Since 1971, it has been called American Studies and has been published by the ASA’s regional chapter, the Mid-America American Studies Association. In 2005, the triannual journal became a quarterly. A merger with American Studies International (ASI), which ceased publication in 2004, marked a commitment to internationalizing the editorial board and increasing the presence of scholarship produced outside the U.S., as well as a commitment to continue the teaching-focused features that had been sustained by ASI.

In 2005, the journal merged with American Studies International and, in 2022, partnered with the Department of American Studies at University of Minnesota. The editorial staff includes: editors-in-chief Sherrie Tucker and Christopher Perreira. In 2020, American Studies revamped the journal's blog as Dialogues: Blog of the American Studies Journal, edited by Nishani Frazier since 2022.

American Studies is one of the top journals in the field, with a U.S. circulation of roughly 1,200 and an international circulation averaging around 500. The journal is available open-source with a rolling embargo of 3 years and is available full-text through the following databases: JSTOR, Project Muse, ProQuest, and EBSCO. American Studies uses a double-anonymous peer-review process. Each submission that moves through the process is typically sent to three readers, two from the editorial board and one specialist. AMSJ's acceptance rate is approximately 25%.

Special Issues 

Each year, American Studies publishes a special issue that concerns a single theme of interest in the field and is managed by a guest editor or a team of editors.

Editorship Timeline 

* includes years as associate status or guest editor

**associate from 1979 - 1988

American Studies Editorial Board 

Crystal Anderson, George Mason University

Fernando Armstrong-Fumero, Smith College

Thomas Augst, New York University

Davarian Baldwin, Trinity College

Astrid Böger, University of Hamburg, Germany

Edward Chan, Waseda University, Japan

Dawn Coleman, University of Tennessee

Clare Corbould, Deakin University, Australia

Todd Decker, Washington University in St. Louis

Dennis Domer, University of Kansas

Phillip Drake, University of Kansas

Gerald Early, Washington University in St. Louis

Keith Eggener, University of Oregon

Nan Enstad, University of Wisconsin-Madison

Daniele Fiorentino, Università Roma Tre, Italy

Stephanie Fitzgerald, Arizona State University

Randall Fuller, University of Kansas

John Gennari, University of Vermont

Tanya Golash-Boza, University of California, Merced

William Graebner, State University of New York at Fredonia

Douglas Hartmann, University of Minnesota

Udo Hebel, University of Regensburg, Germany

Rebecca Hill, Kennesaw State University

Mark Hulsether, University of Tennessee, Knoxville

Serenity Joo, University of Manitoba, Canada

L.S. Kim, University of California, Santa Cruz

Brian Leech, Augustana College

Cheryl Lester, University of Kansas

Tiffany Ana López, University of California, Irvine

Emily Lordi, Vanderbilt University

Nicola Mann, Richmond University, London

Carol Mason, University of Kentucky

Fiona Ngô, University of Virginia

Eric Porter, University of California, Santa Cruz

Sonnet Retman, University of Washington

David Roediger, University of Kansas

Wilfried Raussert, Bielefeld University, Germany

Eric Sandeen, University of Wyoming

Alex Seago, Richmond University, London

David Serlin, University of California, San Diego

Jane Simonsen, Augustana College

Carolyn Thomas, California State University, Fullerton

Deborah Vargas, Yale University

Travis Vogan, University of Iowa

Shirley Wajda, Michigan State University Museum

Psyche Williams-Forson, University of Maryland

References

External links 
 
 Dialogues: Blog of the American Studies Journal
 Mid-America American Studies Association

American studies journals
Quarterly journals
English-language journals
Publications established in 1960
University of Kansas
1960 establishments in Kansas